The SS Division Hitlerjugend or 12th SS Panzer Division "Hitlerjugend" was a German armoured division of the Waffen-SS during World War II. The majority of its junior enlisted men were drawn from members of the Hitler Youth, while the senior NCOs and officers were from other Waffen-SS divisions.

The division committed several war crimes while en route to and during the early battles of the Allied Normandy landings, including the Ascq and Normandy massacres, and several massacres, arsons and rapes in cities Plomion, Tavaux, Bouillon, Godinne, Hun, Rivere, Warnant and Namur. It first saw action on 7 June 1944 as part of the German defensive operations at Caen, and suffered great casualties during the Battle of the Falaise Pocket.

In December 1944, the division was committed against the US Army in the Ardennes offensive. After the operation's failure, which became known as the Battle of the Bulge, the division was sent to Hungary to participate in fighting around Budapest. The division eventually retreated into Austria and surrendered to the 7th US Army on 8 May 1945. After the war several members of the division, including its commander Kurt Meyer, were convicted of war crimes.

Formation and training

The idea for the Waffen-SS division was first proposed by Artur Axmann, the leader of the Hitler Youth, to Reichsführer-SS Heinrich Himmler in early 1943. The plan for a division made up of Hitler Youth members born in 1926 was passed on to Adolf Hitler for his approval. Hitler approved the plan in February and SS-Gruppenführer Gottlob Berger was ordered to recruit the personnel. SS-Oberführer Fritz Witt of 1st SS Panzer Division Leibstandarte SS Adolf Hitler (LSSAH) was appointed the divisional commander. Personnel from the LSSAH provided the regimental, battalion and most of the company commanders for the division.

About 2,000 personnel were transferred from the LSSAH and in September 1943, the division had over 16,000 recruits on its roster, undergoing training in Beverloo Camp in Leopoldsburg, Belgium. The indoctrination was often brutal; while in Allied captivity, an SS man from the division recalled: "In the Waffen-SS you couldn't do anything if an Unterfuhrer hit you during the training. The purpose of the training is to make you just as they are; it's pure sadism". (The comments have also been taken from similar transcripts).

In March 1944 the 12th SS was attached to the I SS Panzer Corps and transferred to Caen in Normandy. At the beginning of June, the division had over 150 tanks.

Ascq massacre

The division committed its first massacre while en route to Normandy. The division executed 86 French men on 1 April 1944 in Ascq, France, in a reprisal against the civilian population after the railway they were on was sabotaged. The commander of the convoy, SS-Obersturmführer Walter Hauck, ordered troops to search and arrest all male members of the houses on both sides of the track. Altogether, 70 men were shot beside the railway line and another 16 killed in the village. In 1949, Hauck was put on trial in Lille, France, and was sentenced to death. His sentence was later commuted to life imprisonment. He was freed in 1957 after a further sentence reduction.

Normandy

On 6 June 1944, the division, along with the 21st Panzer Division, were the closest Panzer divisions to the landing beaches but they were unable to move until ordered by the Oberkommando der Wehrmacht (OKW, armed forces high command). The division was ordered to the front at 14:30 hours on 6 June, over twelve hours after the first reports of the landings. Prior to this Field Marshal Gerd von Rundstedt had ordered over half of the division to deal with a parachute landing on the coast near Lisieux which was found to be dummies from Operation Titanic.

The division's advance to the areas near the British–Canadian landing beaches of Sword and Juno Beaches proceeded slowly due to Allied air attacks. The first units of the 12th SS finally reached their assembly area near Evrecy at 22:00 hours on 6 June but the Panther battalion ran out of fuel east of the Orne River. According to Marc Milner, "[t]his was just the first example of sloppy staff work and command and control that characterized 12th SS Division's experience in the beachhead battles".

At 10:00 hours on 7 June, the 25th SS Panzergrenadier Regiment, along with 50 Panzer IV tanks of the 12th SS Panzer Regiment, arrived and moved into position north-west of Caen. Supported by a battalion of artillery (3rd Battalion, 12th SS Panzer Regiment), this battle group was ordered to stop the Canadian advance and drive through to the coast, a few kilometres away. They failed to break through the Canadians around Buron, a kilometre to the north. Meyer countermanded the divisional commander's order on his own initiative, feeling that objective unrealistic and hoped merely to stop the flow of Canadian units inland until the situation could be stabilized.

The attack by the division was supposed to have been supported by the 21st Panzer Division but they could not disengage from fighting the British 3rd Infantry Division and were still at Couvre. Casualties of the 25th SS Panzergrenadier Regiment amounted to about 300 men, while 15 tanks from the 12th SS Panzer Regiment were also destroyed. Late on 7 June, the 26th SS Panzergrenadier Regiment under command of then SS-Obersturmbannfuhrer Wilhelm Mohnke arrived on the battlefield. Meyer had pushed back one part of the Canadian advance but to the west, the 7th Canadian Infantry Brigade had occupied a group of small villages three kilometres into the German line. The 26th Panzergrenadier Regiment crossed behind Meyer's regiment and took post to the west. The 1st Battalion launched an attack towards Norrey-en-Bessin, defended by the Regina Rifles, 7th Canadian Infantry Brigade, 3rd Canadian Division. Their orders were to overrun the Canadians and force a deep wedge between them and the British to the west. No reconnaissance of the Canadian positions was done and the infantry met intense defensive fire from firmly established positions.

The attack at 03:30 hours on 8 June had little initial success. The various companies in the attacking battalion failed to coordinate effectively and suffered many casualties. Facing Canadian artillery and the supporting heavy machine guns of the Cameron Highlanders of Ottawa, the 1st Battalion of the 12th SS was forced to fall back. Despite suffering losses themselves, the Regina Rifles stood their ground. The Hitlerjugend division was criticized for performing inadequately in the opening days of the Normandy campaign, with Canadian Brigadier Harry Foster later noting that "no use was made of the fact that the Reginas' flanks were exposed; instead, the enemy flung himself straight against the strongest points and utterly failed to exploit the undoubted weakness of his opponent's position".

On the Canadian right, the 2nd Battalion attacked the Royal Winnipeg Rifles defending the village of Putot-en-Bessin at 06:30 hours. The battalion managed to break into the village and surround several companies, pushing the Winnipeg Rifles out of the village by 13:00 hours and inflicting 256 casualties – of which 175 were taken prisoner. Later that day, a counter-attack by the Canadian Scottish Regiment, with artillery, tank and tank-destroyer support, re-took Putot with the SS giving up the struggle for the town and withdrawing around midnight.

Oliver Haller concluded that "It is evident that the 12th SS was not capable of conducting successful offensive operations against prepared positions in Normandy. Artillery and anti-tank guns were the key to victory, and the Allies possessed large numbers of these effective weapons. All of the German assaults were checked and defeated in detail. The 3rd Canadian Division had won a decisive victory."

The 3rd Canadian Division ceased major combat operations until July, with only one day of major operations, on 11 June, at Le Mesnil-Patry. This saw the 12th SS inflict many casualties on the Queen's Own Rifles of Canada and the 1st Hussars (6th Armoured Regiment) which lost 51 Sherman tanks during the attack. Also on 11 June the 46th Royal Marine Commando assaulted Rots. The official historian of Le Régiment de la Chaudière, described the "ferocious battle" including hand-to-hand fighting and "smoldering" tanks: "from each blackened turret hangs the charred corpse of a machine gunner". The following two weeks was a period of relative quiet, as both sides were exhausted. What did not stop was the constant Allied artillery, naval bombardment and air attacks. Major operations for both sides began again in July, including Operation Windsor and Operation Charnwood.

During Charnwood, the division was driven from its positions in Buron and nearby villages of Gruchy and Cussy and the divisional command post in the Ardenne Abbey, which had been occupied since before D-Day, was lost. Witt was killed in action by a Royal Navy naval artillery barrage which hit the divisional command post at Venoix on 14 June 1944. Kurt Meyer was placed in command of the division. Over the course of August, the division was involved in the fighting around Falaise against the Polish 1st Armoured Division battlegroups who were trying to close the Falaise Pocket. The 12th SS, along with several other German units, was instrumental in re-opening the corridor out of the pocket on the 20th of August, allowing an estimated 10.000 German soldiers to escape encirclement. 

During their retreat from France, members of the LSSAH and the Hitlerjugend division murdered 34 French civilians in the towns of Tavaux and Plomion. The units in the division that were not fit for combat were ordered to pull back to Germany on 8 September, leaving behind a small Kampfgruppe attached to the SS Division Das Reich. The division losses during the fighting in Normandy, in the three months from June to September, amounted to ca. 8,000 men, over 80% of its tanks, 70% of its armored vehicles, 60% of its artillery and 50% of its motor vehicles.

Ardenne Abbey massacre

Another massacre was committed by the division on its second day of operations during Operation Overlord, the Allied invasion of France. During the evening of 7 June, 11 Canadian prisoners of war from the North Nova Scotia Highlanders, the Stormont, Dundas and Glengarry Highlanders and the 27th Armoured Regiment (The Sherbrooke Fusilier Regiment), were shot in the back of the head. After a year of investigations from August 1944 to August 1945, the Canadian War Crimes Commission (CWCC) strove to discover the details of the murders. As commander of the regiment, Kurt Meyer was the prime suspect. At Meyer's war crimes trial in December 1945, he was found guilty of inciting his troops to commit murder and of being responsible as a commander for the killings at the Abbey. He was sentenced to death on 28 December 1945; his sentence was commuted to life imprisonment in 1946. He was released in 1954.

Ardennes offensive

In September, SS-Obersturmbannführer Hubert Meyer was placed in command of the division. In November 1944, the division was sent to Nienburg in Germany, where it was to be reformed. The majority of reinforcements were transferred from Luftwaffe and Kriegsmarine personnel. Hubert Meyer was replaced by SS-Obersturmbannführer Hugo Kraas, and the division was attached to the 6th SS Panzer Army of SS-Oberstgruppenführer Sepp Dietrich, which was forming up for Operation Wacht am Rhein (the Second Battle of the Ardennes, popularly known as the Battle of the Bulge), a large-scale offensive to recapture Antwerp and halt the Allied advance. The operation opened on 16 December 1944, with Kampfgruppe Peiper from the 1st SS Panzer Division Leibstandarte SS Adolf Hitler breaking through the American lines with some difficulty. After the 12th SS reached the front, it was met with heavy resistance from American troops stationed on the Elsenborn Ridge. Despite repeated efforts, the division could not budge the American defenders. As a result, the division was ordered to swing left and follow the advance line of the remainder of the 1st SS Panzer Division. American troops prevented the division from reaching its objective, and after the destruction of Kampfgruppe Peiper from the LSSAH, the advance of Dietrich's forces was altogether stopped. On 8 January Hitler gave the authorization to withdraw. The attack was ultimately a failure. The 12th SS had been severely mauled, with only 26 tanks and assault guns and an average of 120 men remaining in each battalion. In total during the offensive the division had lost 9,870 men which included 328 officers and 1,698 NCO's. By 28 January 1945, the 12th SS, along with all the German forces, had been pushed back to its starting positions.

1945

On 14 January 1945, Dietrich's 6th SS Panzer Army was ordered to Hungary where it was to take part in an offensive to recapture the Hungarian oilfields and open the way to Budapest, where 45,000 men of the IX SS Mountain Corps had been encircled. While the division was in transit, the IV SS Panzer Corps launched several unsuccessful relief operations. The division, alongside the LSSAH as a part of I SS Panzer Corps arrived in Hungary in early February 1945, a few days before the city fell. The division next took part in Operation Spring Awakening, another operation to retake the Hungarian oilfields. The attack got underway on 6 March 1945; after initial success, the combination of the muddy terrain and strong Soviet resistance ground them to a halt. On 16 March, the Soviet forces counterattacked in strength, driving the entire southern front into a retreat towards Vienna. The Soviet forces took Vienna on 13 April. Retreating through Odenburg and Hirtenberg, the division reached Linz, Austria near the American lines. On 8 May 1945, 10,000 men of the division surrendered near the town of Enns to the troops of the 65th Infantry Division commanded by Major General Stanley Eric Reinhart.

Organization 
The organization structure of this SS formation was as follows:

Commanders

See also
 List of Waffen-SS units
 SS Panzer Division order of battle

References

Citations

Bibliography

 
 
 
 
 
 Meyer Kurt, Grenadiers, JJ Fedorowicz Publishing ltd, 2001, 
 Meyer Hubert, The 12th SS: The History of the Hitler Youth Panzer Division, Stackpole Books, 2005, 
 Meyer Hubert, The 12th SS Volume Two: The History of the Hitler Youth Panzer Division, Stackpole Books, 2005, 
 
 Mitcham Samuel W, Panzers in Winter: Hitler's Army and the Battle of the Bulge, Greenwood Publishing Group, 2006, 
 
 Reynolds Michael, Steel Inferno, Spellmount Publishing, 2008, 
 
 

12
German units in Normandy
Hitler Youth
Military units and formations established in 1943
Panzer divisions of the Waffen-SS
Military units and formations disestablished in 1945